Husbands Run is a  long tributary to Brandywine Creek in New Castle County, Delaware north of Wilmington, Delaware. It rises in Woodley Park between the Tavistock Woodbrook, Sharpley and Edenridge neighborhoods. It flows through DuPont Country Club, where it is joined by  the Willow Run and mouths north of Delaware Route 141.
The Husbands were early settlers to the region.

See also
List of Delaware rivers

References

Rivers of Delaware
Rivers of New Castle County, Delaware
Tributaries of the Christina River